The 2002–03 NCAA Division I men's ice hockey season began on October 4, 2002, and concluded with the 2003 NCAA Division I Men's Ice Hockey Tournament's championship game on April 12, 2003, at the HSBC Arena in Buffalo, New York. This was the 56th season in which an NCAA ice hockey championship was held and is the 109th year overall where an NCAA school fielded a team. The 2002–03 season was the final year for the MAAC hockey conference when Iona and Fairfield ended their programs at the conclusion of the season.

The NCAA Division I Men's Ice Hockey Tournament expanded to 16 teams for the first time in 2003. As a result, two regional sites were added for the new Northeast and Midwest brackets.

Pre-season polls

The top 15 from USCHO.com/CBS College Sports and the top 15 from USA Today/USA Hockey Magazine.

Regular season

Season tournaments

Standings

2003 NCAA Tournament

Note: * denotes overtime period(s)

Player stats

Scoring leaders
The following players led the league in points at the conclusion of the season.

  
GP = Games played; G = Goals; A = Assists; Pts = Points; PIM = Penalty minutes

Leading goaltenders
The following goaltenders led the league in goals against average at the end of the regular season while playing at least 33% of their team's total minutes.

GP = Games played; Min = Minutes played; W = Wins; L = Losses; OT = Overtime/shootout losses; GA = Goals against; SO = Shutouts; SV% = Save percentage; GAA = Goals against average

Awards

NCAA

CCHA

CHA

ECAC

Hockey East

MAAC

WCHA

See also
 2002–03 NCAA Division III men's ice hockey season

References

External links
USCHO.com 
College Hockey Historical Archives
Inside College Hockey
College Hockey Stats.net

 
NCAA